Charles Pelly (31 July 1812 – 30 December 1885) was a British civil servant of the Indian Civil Service who served as the revenue member of the Madras Legislative Council from 1862 to 1866. He was reappointed as an additional Member in 1866.

Personal
Pelly was the son of Sir John Pelly, 1st Baronet, and his wife, Emma Boulton. In 1839 at Toomcoor, Pelly married Julia Henrietta Dobbs, daughter of Rev. Richard Stewart Dobbs and his wife, Harriet Macauley. He and Harriet had nine children, one of whom was Rear Admiral Francis Raymond Pelly (1851-1907).

References

Other sources 
K. C. Markandan (1964). Madras Legislative Council: Its Constitution and Working Between 1861 and 1909. S. Chand & Co.
Madras (India, and Presidency). (1867) Board of Revenue. Village Revenue Establishments of the Madras Presidency. Ganz.

1812 births
1885 deaths
Indian Civil Service (British India) officers
British East India Company civil servants
Members of the Madras Legislative Council